, provisionally known as 2001 XT254,  is a Kuiper belt object (KBO) that has a 3:7 resonance with Neptune.

It will come to perihelion in January 2016.

Assuming a generic TNO albedo of 0.09, it is about 146 km in diameter.

Resonance
Simulations by Emel’yanenko and Kiseleva in 2007 show that  is librating in a 3:7 resonance with Neptune.  This libration can be stable for less than 100 million to billions of years.

It has been observed 22 times over 4 oppositions.

See also
 has a similar resonant behavior.

References

External links 
 

131696
Discoveries by Scott S. Sheppard
Discoveries by Jan Kleyna
Discoveries by David C. Jewitt
20011209